Leshan or LeShan may refer to:

 Leshan, a prefecture-level city in Sichuan Provence, China
 Leshan (Kosovo), namely Lešane,a settlement in Suva Reka, Kosovo
 Leshan David Lewis, a hip-hop producer better known as L.E.S.
 Eda LeShan (1922–2002), an American writer, television host, counselor, educator, and playwright
 Lawrence LeShan (1920–), a psychologist, educator, and author